Cemophora coccinea copei, commonly known as the northern scarlet snake, is a subspecies of harmless colubrid snake that is native to the southern and eastern United States.

Etymology
The specific name or epithet, copei, is in honor of renowned American taxonomist Edward Drinker Cope.

Description
The northern scarlet snake grows to 36–51 cm (14-20 inches) in total length (including tail). It is typically a gray or white base color, with 17-24 red blotches bordered by black that go down the back. The black borders on the blotches often join on the lower sides of the snake forming a line down the length of the body. The dorsal scales are smooth. The northern scarlet snake can sometimes be mistaken for the scarlet kingsnake (Lampropeltis triangulum elapsoides) or the eastern milk snake (Lampropeltis triangulum triangulum) in the areas where the geographic ranges of the species overlap.

Behavior
The northern scarlet snake is a secretive, burrowing species, preferring habitats of soft soils, often in open forested areas or developed agricultural land. They spend most of their time hidden, emerging to feed on small rodents and lizards, but they have a particular taste for reptile eggs, swallowing them whole or puncturing them and consuming the contents.

Reproduction
Mating of the northern scarlet snake occurs in March through June, with 3-8 eggs laid in mid summer, and hatching in early fall. Each hatchling is 13–15 cm (5-6 inches) in total length (including tail).

Geographic distribution
The northern scarlet snake is found in the United States, in: eastern Texas, eastern Oklahoma, Arkansas, Louisiana, Mississippi, Alabama, Georgia, South Carolina, North Carolina, Tennessee, Kentucky, Illinois, southern Indiana, Virginia, Maryland, Delaware, and barely into northern Florida, with disjunct populations New Jersey, and central Missouri.

Conservation status
The northern scarlet snake holds no particular conservation status throughout most of its range, but it is listed as endangered species in the states of Indiana and Florida. It is only found in a single county in each state as these are the northern and southern extents of its range.

References

External links

Herps of Texas: Cemophora coccinea
Animals of the Big Thicket Natural Preserve

Further reading
Jan G (1863). "Enumerazione sistematica degli ofidi appartenenti al gruppo Coronellidae ". Archivio per la zoologia, l'anatomia e la fisiologia 2 (2): 213-230 + Plates XVII-XVIII. (Cemophora copei, new species, p. 231). (in Italian). 
Powell R, Conant R, Collins JT (2016). Peterson Field Guide to Reptiles and Amphibians of Eastern and Central North America, Fourth Edition. Boston and New York: Houghton Mifflin Harcourt. xiv + 494 pp., 207 Figures, 47 Plates. . (Cemophora coccinea copei, pp. 367–368).
Smith HM; Brodie ED Jr. (1982). Reptiles of North America: A Guide to Field Identification. New York: Golden Press. 240 pp.  (paperback),  (hardcover). (Cemophora coccinea copei, p. 178).

Cemophora
Fauna of the Southeastern United States
Fauna of the Eastern United States
Reptiles of the United States
Reptiles described in 1863